Drinking culture is the set of traditions and social behaviors that surround the consumption of alcoholic beverages as a recreational drug and social lubricant. Although alcoholic beverages and social attitudes toward drinking vary around the world, nearly every civilization has independently discovered the processes of brewing beer, fermenting wine and distilling spirits.

Alcohol and its effects have been present in societies throughout history. Drinking is documented in the Hebrew and Christian Bibles, in the Qur'an, in art history, in Greek and Roman literature as old as Homer and in Confucius's Analects.

Social drinking
"Social drinking", also commonly referred to as "responsible drinking", refers to casual drinking of alcoholic beverages in a social setting without an intent to become intoxicated. In Western cultures, good news is often celebrated by a group of people having a few alcoholic drinks. For example, alcoholic drinks may be served to "wet the baby's head" in the celebration of a birth. Buying someone an alcoholic drink is often considered a gesture of goodwill. It may be an expression of gratitude, or it may mark the resolution of a dispute.

Drinking etiquette

For the purposes of buying rounds of alcoholic drinks in English public houses, William Greaves, a retired London journalist, devised a set of etiquette guidelines as a Saturday morning essay in the defunct Today newspaper. Known as Greaves' Rules, the guidelines were based upon his long experience of pubs and rounds. The rules were later recommissioned by The Daily Telegraph and published in that newspaper on November 20, 1993. Copies of the rules soon appeared in many pubs throughout the United Kingdom.

Kate Fox, a social anthropologist, came up with a similar idea in her book Watching the English, but concluded their rationale was the need to minimise the possibility of violence between drinking companions.

When taking alcohol to a BYOB (bring your own bottle/booze/beer) party, it is proper for a guest to leave any unconsumed alcohol behind when leaving the party. It shows appreciation to the host and shows responsibility on the guest's part. It is considered rude to take any alcohol back when departing.

Drinking at early times of the day is frowned upon in some cultures.

Noon is often seen as earliest appropriate time of day to consume alcohol, especially on its own, although there are some exceptions such as drinking Buck's Fizzes on Christmas Day morning.  Likewise, a mimosa or bloody mary with breakfast or brunch is common in many cultures.

Free drinks

Various cultures and traditions feature the social practice of providing free alcoholic drinks for others. For example, during a wedding reception or a bar mitzvah, free alcoholic drinks are often served to guests, a practice that is known as "an open bar". Free alcoholic drinks may also be offered to increase attendance at a social or business function. They are commonly offered to casino patrons to entice them to continue gambling.

A further example is the "ladies drink free" policy of some bars, which is intended to attract more paying customers (i.e., men).

Large corporations (especially in Japan) may have a favored bar at which they hold private functions that offer free alcoholic drinks to attendees.

Session drinking

Session drinking is a chiefly British and Irish term that refers to drinking a large quantity of beer during a "session" (i.e. a specific period of time) without becoming too heavily intoxicated. A session is generally a social occasion.

A "session beer", such as a session bitter, is a beer that has a moderate or relatively low alcohol content.

Vertical drinking
Vertical drinking means that all or most of the patrons in an establishment are standing while drinking. This is linked to faster rates of consumption, and can lead to tension and possibly violence as patrons attempt to maneuver around each other.

Binge drinking

Binge drinking is defined as drinking to excess.

The National Institute on Alcohol Abuse and Alcoholism (NIAAA) defines binge drinking as a pattern of drinking alcohol that brings blood alcohol concentration (BAC) to 0.08 grams percent or above. For the typical adult, this pattern corresponds to consuming five or more drinks (men), or four or more drinks (women) in about two hours.

The concept of a "binge" has been somewhat elastic over the years, implying consumption of alcohol far beyond that which is socially acceptable. In earlier decades, "going on a binge" meant drinking over the course of several days until one was no longer able to continue drinking. This usage is known to have entered the English language as late as 1854; it derives from an English dialectal word meaning to "soak" or to "fill a boat with water". (OED, American Heritage Dictionary)

Geographic disparity 
Understanding drinking in young people should be done through a "developmental" framework. This would be referred to as a "whole system" approach to underage drinking, as it takes into account a particular adolescent's unique risk and protective factors—from genetics and personality characteristics to social and environmental factors. It is widely observed that in areas of Europe where children and adolescents routinely consume alcohol early and with parental approval, binge drinking tends to be less prevalent. Typically, a distinction is drawn between northern and southern Europe, with the northerners being the binge drinkers.  The highest levels of both binge-drinking and drunkenness are found in the Nordic countries, UK, Ireland, Slovenia and Latvia. This contrasts with the low levels found in France, Italy, Lithuania, Poland and Romania – for example, binge-drinking more than twice in the last month was reported by 31% of boys [ages?] and 33% of girls in Ireland, but in comparison 12–13% of boys and 5–7% of girls in France and Hungary.

As early as the eighth century, Saint Boniface was writing to Cuthbert, Archbishop of Canterbury, to report how "In your diocese, the vice of drunkenness is too frequent. This is an evil peculiar to pagans and to our race. Neither the Franks nor the Gauls nor the Lombards nor the Romans nor the Greeks commit it". It is probable, however, that "the vice of drunkenness" was present in all European nations. The 16th-century Frenchman Rabelais wrote comedic and absurd satires illustrating his countrymen's drinking habits, and Saint Augustin used the example of a drunkard in Rome to illustrate certain spiritual principles.

Some studies have noted traditional, cultural differences between Northern and Southern Europe. A difference in perception may also account to some extent for historically noted cultural differences: Northern Europeans drink beer, which in the past was often of a low alcohol content (2.5% compared to today's 5%). In pre-industrial society, beer was safer to drink than water, because it had been boiled and contained alcohol. Southern Europeans drink wine and fortified wines (10–20% alcohol by volume). Traditionally, wine was watered and honeyed; drinking full strength wine was considered barbaric in Republican Rome. Nor does binge drinking necessarily equate with substantially higher national averages of per capita/per annum litres of pure alcohol consumption. There is also a physical aspect to national differences worldwide, which has not yet been thoroughly studied, whereby some ethnic groups have a greater capacity for alcohol metabolization through the liver enzymes alcohol dehydrogenase and acetaldehyde dehydrogenase.

These varying capacities do not, however, avoid all health risks inherent in heavy alcohol consumption. Alcohol abuse is associated with a variety of negative health and safety outcomes. This is true no matter the individual's or the ethnic group's perceived ability to "handle alcohol". Persons who believe themselves immune to the effects of alcohol may often be the most at risk for health concerns and the most dangerous of all operating a vehicle.

"Chronic heavy drinkers display functional tolerance when they show few obvious signs of intoxication, even at high blood alcohol concentrations which in others would be incapacitating or even fatal. Because the drinker does not experience significant behavioral impairment as a result of drinking, tolerance may facilitate the consumption of increasing amounts of alcohol. This can result in physical dependence and alcohol-related organ damage."

Speed drinking

Speed drinking or competitive drinking is the drinking of a small or moderate quantity of beer in the shortest period of time, without an intention of getting heavily intoxicated. Unlike binge drinking, its focus is on competition or the establishment of a record. Speed drinkers typically drink a light beer, such as lager, and they allow it to warm and lose its carbonation to shorten the drinking time.

Guinness World Records (1990 edition, p. 464) listed several records for speed drinking. Among these were:
 Peter G. Dowdeswell (born 1940) of Earls Barton, Northamptonshire, England, drank  in 6 seconds on February 7, 1975.
 Steven Petrosino (born 1951) of New Cumberland, Pennsylvania, US, drank  in 1.3 seconds on June 22, 1977, at the Gingerbread Man Pub in Carlisle, Pennsylvania.

Neither of these records had been defeated when Guinness World Records banned all alcohol-related records from their book in 1991.

Former Australian Prime Minister Bob Hawke held a record for the fastest consumption of a yard of ale. He drank  in 12 seconds.

See also

 Alcohol enema
 Alcohol use among college students
 Bartending
 Beer festival
 Dive bar
 Drinking culture of Korea
 Drinking games
 Flair bartending
 Happy hour
 List of public house topics
 Pantsdrunk
 Party
 Pregaming
 Sconcing
 Six o'clock swill
 Snaps

References

Bibliography
 
  A humorous account of the drinking culture of Madison Avenue advertising executives during the 1960s. Originally published in 1962 as The 24-Hour Drink Book: A Guide to Executive Survival.

External links
 (Greaves' Rules)